The CWA Gold Dagger for Non-Fiction is a British literary award established in 1978 by the Crime Writers' Association, who have awarded the Gold Dagger fiction award since 1955.

In 1978 and 1979 only there was also a silver award. From 1995 to 2002 it was sponsored by The Macallan (Scotch whisky brand) and known as The Macallan Gold Dagger for Non-Fiction. In 2008 the award was sponsored by Owatonna Media (a London-based literary brand investor and owner). Between 2006 and 2010 it was awarded every other year, in even-numbered years, but in 2011 it returned as an annual award.. The prize is now a cheque for £1,000 and a decorative dagger.

Winners and shortlists

2020s 
2020

 Winner: Casey Cep, Furious Hours: Murder, Fraud and the Last Trial of Harper Lee
 Peter Everett, Corrupt Bodies
 Caroline Goode, Honour: Achieving Justice for Banaz Mahmod
 Sean O'Connor, The Fatal Passion of Alma Rattenbury
 Adam Sisman, The Professor and the Parson
 Susannah Stapleton, The Adventures of Maud West, Lady Detective

2010s 
Winners

2019 

 Ben Macintyre, The Spy and the Traitor, Viking

2018 

 Thomas Harding, Blood on the Page, William Heinemann
2017
Stephen Purvis, Close but no Cigar, Weidenfeld & Nicolson (Close but no Cigar: a true story of prison life in Castro's Cuba).
2016 

 Andrew Hankinson, You Could Do Something Amazing With Your Life [You Are Raoul Moat], Scribe

2015 

 Dan Davies, In Plain Sight: The Life and Lies of Jimmy Savile, Quercus
2014 
Adrian Levy & Cathy Scott-Clark, The Siege, Viking
2013
Paul French, Midnight in Peking, Penguin (The 1937 murder of Pamela Werner in Beijing)
2012 

 Anthony Summers & Robbyn Swan, The Eleventh Day, Transworld
2011
Douglas Starr, The Killer of Little Shepherds (The crimes and conviction of the nineteenth-century French serial murderer Joseph Vacher)

2010
Ruth Dudley Edwards, Aftermath: The Omagh Bombing & the Families’ Pursuit of Justice (The successful civil case taken against the suspects for the Omagh bombing)

2000s
2008
Kester Aspden, Nationality: Wog - The Hounding of David Oluwale (Death of David Oluwale in Leeds in 1969)
Francisco Goldman, The Art of Political Murder: Who Killed Bishop Gerardi (Death of Juan José Gerardi Conedera in Guatemala in 1998)
David Rose, Violation: Justice, Race and Serial Murder in the Deep South (The case of Carlton Gary, sentenced to death in 1986 in Georgia, USA)
Duncan Staff, The Lost Boy (Keith Bennett, victim of the Moors Murders, England, 1964)
Kate Summerscale, The Suspicions of Mr Whicher or The Murder at Road Hill House (Murder in 1860 in Somerset, England, to which Constance Kent confessed)
Peter Zimonjic, Into the Darkness: 7/7 (First-hand account of the 7 July 2005 London bombings)

2006
Linda Rhodes, Lee Shelden, and Kathryn Abnett, The Dagenham Murder: The Brutal Killing of PC George Clark, 1846 (Murder of policeman George Clark in 1846 in Dagenham, London)
Sebastian Junger, A Death in Belmont (Boston Strangler murders of 1962-64 in USA)
Nuala O'Faolain, The Story of Chicago May (Irish-born international criminal Chicago May, born May Duignan)
Sister Helen Prejean, The Death of Innocents: An Eyewitness Account of Wrongful Executions (Executions of Dobie Gillis Williams (1999) and Joseph O'Dell in USA)
William Queen, Under and Alone: The True Story of the Undercover Agent Who Infiltrated America's Most Violent Outlaw Motorcycle Gang (First-hand account of infiltrating Mongols gang in USA)
Sue Williams, And Then the Darkness: The Fascinating Story of the Disappearance of Peter Falconio and the Trials of Joanne Lees (Disappearance of Peter Falconio in Australia, 2001)

2005
Gregg and Gina Hill, On The Run: a Mafia childhood (By the children of Henry Hill, American mobster)
Bella Bathurst, The Wreckers: A Story of Killing Seas, False Lights, and Plundered Shipwrecks. (Wrecking off the UK coast)
Eric Jager, The Last Duel: A True Story of Crime, Scandal, and Trial by Combat in Medieval France (Trial by combat of Jean de Carrouges, France, 1386)
Sadakat Kadri, The Trial: a history from Socrates to O. J. Simpson (History of trials).
James Owen, A Serpent in Eden: The Greatest Murder Mystery of All Time (Murder of Harry Oakes in Nassau, Bahamas, in 1943)

2004
Joint winners
John Dickie, Cosa Nostra: A History of the Sicilian Mafia (History of the Sicilian mafia from its 1860s beginnings)
Sarah Wise, The Italian Boy: Murder and Grave Robbery in 1830s London (The Italian Boy murder, London, 1831)
Rebecca Gowers, The Swamp of Death: A True Tale of Victorian Lies and Murder (Reginald Birchall, a young Englishman who set off for Canada in 1890 and was found dead in a swamp shortly after arriving)
Steve Holland, The Trials of Hank Janson (Censorship of crime writer Hank Janson in 1940s Britain)
Mende Nazer and Damian Lewis, Slave: The True Story of a Girl's Lost Childhood and her Fight for Survival (Mende Nazer's own story)

2003Samantha Weinberg, Pointing from the Grave: a True Story of Murder and DNA (Murder of Helena Greenwood in 1985 in California and early use of DNA profiling to identify her killer 15 years later)
Michael Bilton, Wicked Beyond Belief: the Hunt for the Yorkshire Ripper (Peter Sutcliffe, serial killer convicted in 1981)
Erik Larson, Devil In The White City:Murder, Magic, and Madness at the Fair that Changed America (Serial killer H. H. Holmes and the 1893 Chicago World's Fair, USA)
Chandak Sengoopta, Imprint of the Raj: the Colonial Origin of Fingerprinting and Its Voyage to Britain (The science of fingerprinting, developed in India and first used in court in England in 1902)
Donald Thomas, An Underworld at War: Spivs, Deserters, Racketeers and Civilians in the Second World War (Events in Britain during World War II)
Peter Walsh, Gang War: the Inside Story of the Manchester Gangs (Contemporary gangs in Manchester)

2002Lillian Pizzichini, Dead Man's Wages: the secrets of a London conman and his family (Life of conman Charlie Taylor, the author's grandfather)
Miranda Carter, Anthony Blunt, His Lives (Anthony Blunt (1907-1983), British spy and art historian)
Don Hale (with Marika Huns & Hamish McGregor), Town Without Pity: the Fight to Clear Stephen Downing of the Bakewell Murder (Stephen Downing, jailed for murder in 1974, conviction overturned in 2002)
Special mention: Julian Earwaker & Kathleen Becker, Scene of the Crime: a Guide to the Landscapes of British Detective FictionJudged to be outside the scope of the award but worthy of commendation

2001Philip Etienne and Martin Maynard (with Tony Thompson), The Infiltrators: the First Inside Account of Life Deep Undercover with Scotland Yard's Most Secret Unit (Two members of SO10, the Metropolitan Police's undercover unit)
Zacaria Erzinçlioglu, Maggots, Murder and Men: Memories and Reflections of a Forensic Entomologist (Forensic entomology)
Adrian Weale, Patriot Traitors: Roger Casement, John Amery and the Real Meaning of Treason (Roger Casement and John Amery, the only Britons to be executed for high treason in the 20th century)

2000Edward Bunker, Mr. Blue: Memoirs of a Renegade' (The author's own story of a life of crime)

1990s
1999  	
Brian Cathcart, The Case of Stephen Lawrence  	
1998
Gitta Sereny, Cries Unheard: Why Children Kill - The Story of Mary Bell1997
Paul Britton, The Jigsaw Man (The Remarkable Career of Britain's Foremost Criminal Psychologist) 	
1996 	
Antonia Fraser, The Gunpowder Plot 	
1995
 Martin Beales, Dead Not Buried 	
1994
 David Canter, Criminal Shadows: Inside the Mind of the Serial Killer 	
1993
 Alexandra Artley, Murder in the Heart1992
 Charles Nicholl, The Reckoning1991
John Bossy, Giordano Bruno and the Embassy Affair 	
1990
 Jonathan Goodman, The Passing of Starr Faithfull1980s
1989
 Robert Lindsey, A Gathering of Saints: A True Story of Money, Murder and Deceit1988
Bernard Wasserstein, The Secret Lives of Trebitsch Lincoln 	
1987
Bernard Taylor/Stephen Knight, Perfect Murder 	
1986
John Bryson, Evil Angels 	
1985
Brian Masters, Killing for Company 	
1984
 David Yallop, In God's Name 	
1983
 Peter Watson, Double Dealer: How Five Art Dealers, Four Policemen, Three Picture Restorers, Two Auction Houses and a Journalist Plotted to Recover Some of the World's Most Beautiful Stolen Paintings1982
 John Cornwell, Earth to Earth 	
1981
 Jacobo Timerman, Prisoner Without a Name, Cell Without a Number 	
1980
 Anthony Summers, Conspiracy1970s
1979
Shirley Green, Rachman 	
1978
 Audrey Williamson, The Mystery of the Princes''

References

External links
CWA website: The CWA Gold Dagger for Non-Fiction

Gold
British non-fiction literary awards
1978 establishments in the United Kingdom
Awards established in 1978